Kumudlal Ganguly (13 October 1911 – 10 December 2001), better known by his stage name Ashok Kumar and also by Dadamoni, was an Indian actor who attained iconic status in Indian cinema. He was a member of the cinematic Ganguly family.

He was honoured in 1988 with the Dadasaheb Phalke Award, the highest national award for cinema artists, by the Government of India. He also received the Padma Bhushan in 1999 for his contributions to Indian cinema.

Background and personal life 

Ashok Kumar was born Kumudlal Ganguly to a Bengali Hindu Brahmin family in Bhagalpur, Bengal Presidency, British India (present-day Bihar, India). His father, Kunjlal Ganguly, was a lawyer while his mother, Gouri Devi, was a house wife. Kumudlal was the eldest of four children. His only sister, Sati Devi, a few years younger to him, was married at a very young age to Sashadhar Mukherjee and became the matriarch of a large "film family". Next was his brother, Kalyan, 16 years younger (b.1927), who later took the screen name Anoop Kumar. Youngest of all was Abhas (b.1929), whose screen name was Kishore Kumar, who became a phenomenally successful playback singer of Hindi films. Although the eldest by several years, Kumudlal outlived all his siblings. In fact, he stopped celebrating his birthday after his youngest brother, Kishore, died on that day in 1987.

While still a teenager and well before he had even given thought to a career in films, the young Kumudlal was married to Shobha, a girl of his own Bengali Brahmin community and similar family background, in a match arranged by their parents in the usual Indian way. Their lifelong marriage was a harmonious and conventional one, and despite his film career, the couple retained a very middle-class outlook and value system, bringing up their children with traditional values in a remarkably simple home. They were the parents of one son, Aroop Ganguly, and three daughters named Bharati Patel, Rupa Verma and Preeti Ganguly. Aroop Kumar Ganguly worked in only one film, appearing as hero in Bezubaan (1962), which flopped at the box office. He then made a career in the corporate world. The eldest daughter, Bharati Patel, is the mother of the actress Anuradha Patel. His second daughter, Rupa Verma, is the widow of the actor and comedian Deven Verma. The youngest daughter, Preeti Ganguly, was the only one among his daughters to enter the film industry. She acted as a comedienne in several Hindi films during the 1970s and 1980s and died unmarried in 2012.

Kumudlal's daughter Bharati married twice. Her first marriage was to a Mr. Patel, a Gujarati gentleman. By this marriage, she had one daughter, the actress Anuradha Patel, who is married to the actor Kanwaljeet Singh. Later, and much against the wishes of all her relatives, Bharati married Hameed Jaffrey, a Muslim, the brother of the actor Saeed Jaffrey. By this second marriage, Bharati also acquired step-daughters, Geneviève and Shaheen, who were Hameed's daughters by his first wife Valerie Salway, a woman of Scottish, Irish, Portuguese and Spanish heritage. Geneviève married a Sindhi businessman named Jagdeep Advani. Their daughter is actress Kiara Advani. Thus, Ashok Kumar has no blood relationship with Kiara Advani but he is related to her in her family tree.

Kumar was educated at Presidency College of the University of Calcutta, Kolkata, where he studied to become a lawyer. However, his heart was not in his law studies. Ganguly was more interested in cinema, in which he dreamt of working as a technician.

Career

Early career (1936–42) 
Kumudlal's father wanted him to become a lawyer and got him enrolled in a law college. However, Kumudlal failed his exams and, to escape acrimony at home, came to live with his sister in Mumbai for a few months, until the exams were held again. Kumudlal's sister Sati Devi had been married at a very young age to Sashadhar Mukherjee, who lived in Chembur in Mumbai and worked in a fairly senior position in the technical department of Bombay Talkies, a pioneering Indian film studio. Kumudlal wanted to earn some spending money for himself, and at his request, Sashadhar Mukherjee used his influence to get him a job as laboratory assistant at Bombay Talkies. This was in the early 1930s. The salary was quite decent; furthermore, Kumudlal was successful at his job and found the work interesting, which had not been the case with law college. He tried to convince his father that he would not become successful as a lawyer and that he would be able to earn a living as a technician or lab assistant. His father would not hear of this, and it required the intervention of Sashadhar Mukherjee before he finally reconciled himself to the situation and agreed to let Kumudlal abandon his law studies. Thus began the storied film career, not as an actor but as laboratory assistant, of the future Ashok Kumar.

Kumudlal was happy working as a laboratory assistant and remained in that position for some five years. His acting career started purely by accident. Shooting was already underway on the Bombay Talkies production Jeevan Naiya in 1936, when the male lead, Najm-ul-Hassan, eloped with his co-star Devika Rani, who happened to be the wife of Himanshu Rai, millionaire owner of Bombay Talkies. Rani subsequently returned to her husband who, out of spite, dismissed Hassan and summarily ordered Kumudlal to replace him. This he did against the advice of director Franz Osten, who reckoned that the young man did not have the good looks needed for an actor. Kumudlal was given the screen name Ashok Kumar, in keeping with the general trend in an era when actors concealed their real identities behind screen names.

Ashok Kumar, as Kumudlal Ganguly was now known, started off his acting career reluctantly. His subsequent venture with Devika Rani in Achhut Kanya, the same year was one of the early blockbusters of Hindi cinema. Like several movies of that era, Achhut Kanya was a reformist piece featuring a Brahmin boy falling in love with a girl from the so-called untouchables in Indian society. The runaway success of Achhut Kanya cemented Ashok Kumar and Devika Rani as the most popular on-screen couple of that era.

The two did a string of films thereafter, including Janmabhoomi (1936), Izzat (1937), Savitri (1937), Vachan (1938) and Nirmala (1938). Their last on-screen venture was the 1941 movie Anjaan, whose failure at the box office brought an end to the on-screen couple.  Devika Rani was consistently the bigger star, with Ashok Kumar working in her shadow.

He started emerging from Devika Rani's shadow owing to pairing opposite Leela Chitnis, another actress who was senior to him in age as well as stature. Back-to-back successes with Kangan (1939), Bandhan (1940) and Azad (1940) saw Ashok Kumar emerge as a popular actor in his own right. The success of Jhoola (1941), in which he starred opposite Leela Chitnis, established him as one of the most bankable actors of the era.

Stardom (1943–50) 

The Gyan Mukherjee directed 1943 movie Kismet, featuring Ashok Kumar as the first anti-hero in Indian Cinema smashed all existing box office records, becoming the first Hindi movie to gross 1 crore at the box office. The success of Kismet made Ashok Kumar the first superstar of Indian cinema. Such was his popularity at the time that, in the words of Manto, "Ashok's popularity grew each passing day. He seldom ventured out, but wherever he was spotted, he was mobbed. Traffic would come to a stop and often the police would have to use lathis to disperse his fans."

After Kismet, Ashok Kumar became the most bankable star of the era, delivering a succession of box office successes with movies such as Chal Chal Re Naujawan (1944), Shikari (1946), Sajan (1947), Mahal (1949), Mashaal (1950), Sangram (1950) and Samadhi (1950).

He produced several films for Bombay Talkies during the final years of the company including Ziddi (1948), which established the careers of Dev Anand and Pran, Neelkamal (1947), which marked the debut of Raj Kapoor, and the famous Mahal in 1949 in which he co-starred with Madhubala.

Post-stardom (1950s) 
With the advent of the 1950s, Ashok Kumar switched over to more mature roles, with the exception of the 1958 classic Howrah Bridge, in which he starred alongside Madhubala. Despite the arrival of a younger crop of stars like Dev Anand, Dilip Kumar and Raj Kapoor, Ashok Kumar remained one of the stars of the era with hits like Afsana (1951), Nau Bahar (1952), Parineeta (1953), Bandish (1955), Ek Hi Raasta (1956), Ek Saal (1957) and Howrah Bridge (1958). His most successful film of that era was Deedar (1951), in which he played second lead to Dilip Kumar.

Ashok Kumar appeared frequently opposite Nalini Jaywant in several movies of the 1950s. He did around 17 films with Meena Kumari in a span of twenty years ranging from Tamasha in 1952 to 1972 magnum opus, Pakeezah. He played the suave cigarette-smoking criminal or police officer in several films in the mid to late 1950s, in what was the Indian film-noir movement.

Later career (1960s and 1970s) 
By the 1960s, Ashok Kumar switched over to character roles, variously playing the parent, uncle or grandparent, being careful never to be typecast.
From a judge in Kanoon (1960), an aging freedom fighter in Bandini (1963), a caring brother in Mere Mehboob (1963), an aging priest in Chitralekha (1964), a vicious zamindar in Jawaab (1970) and a criminal in Victoria no.203 (1971), he played a wide variety of roles.

Ashok Kumar played important roles in several landmark movies in the 1960s and 1970s, including Jewel Thief (1967), Aashirwad (1968) (for which he won a Filmfare Award as well as National Award in 1969), Purab aur Pashchim (1970), Pakeezah (1972), Mili (1975), Chhoti Si Baat (1975) and Khoobsurat (1980).

Ashok Kumar and Pran were best friends and have acted in 27 films together from 1951 to 1987 and had 20 super-hit films together. Films like Purab Aur Pashchim, Victoria 203, Chor Ke Ghar Chor, Chori Mera Kaam, Adhikar (1971), Maan Gaye Ustad were major hits.

He teamed up with Shashi Kapoor and Rajesh Khanna in many films in 1970s and 1980s and acted as the main supporting actor in their films.

Final years 
He acted in fewer films in the 1980s and 1990s, and occasionally appeared on television, most famously anchoring the first Indian soap opera Hum Log and appearing as the title character in the unforgettable Bahadur Shah Zafar. Ashok Kumar acted in three episodes of famous detective TV serial Tehkikaat with Vijay Anand and Saurabh Shukla in an episode called A Lucky Draw - Murders after a lucky draw.

Ashok Kumar's last film role was in the 1997 movie Aankhon Mein Tum Ho. Besides acting, he was an avid painter and a practitioner of homeopathy. A qualified homoeopath, Ashok Kumar earned a reputation for conjuring up miracle cures. Altogether, he starred in over 275 films. He has done more than 30 Bengali dramas in Dhakuria.

Death 
Ashok Kumar died at the age of 90 in Mumbai on 10 December 2001 of heart failure at his residence in Chembur. The then Prime Minister Atal Bihari Vajpayee described him as "an inspiration... for many generations of aspiring actors."

Legacy 

Ashok Kumar was a pioneering actor who introduced natural acting to Hindi cinema. He was the first superstar of Hindi cinema as well as the first lead actor to play an anti-hero. He also became the first star to reinvent himself, enjoying a long and hugely successful career as a character actor.

Ashok Kumar is also credited with mentoring several personalities who went on to make significant contributions to Indian cinema. As producer with Bombay Talkies, Ashok Kumar gave Dev Anand his first break in Ziddi (1948), which also established Pran (then a struggling actor who had just fled to India during partition), as one of the leading villains of the era. The 1949 film Mahal, starring Ashok Kumar and made under his watch at Bombay Talkies launched the career of Madhubala, one of the leading actresses of the 1950s. The song "Aayega Aanewala" from Mahal was the turning point in the career of a hitherto little known young singer called Lata Mangeshkar.

Off the screen, Ashok Kumar gave B.R. Chopra, then a film critic and unsuccessful filmmaker, his first break as director with the 1951 film Afsana. The success of Afsana established Chopra as a respected filmmaker. Ashok Kumar also played mentor to his assistant at Bombay Talkies, Hrishikesh Mukherjee, who went on to become one of the great directors of Hindi cinema. He was the lucky mascot for a promising young director called Shakti Samanta in the late 1950s, delivering a series of hits with Inspector (1956), Howrah Bridge (1958) and Detective (1958) which helped the young man establish himself as a successful director. Shakti Samanta would go on to deliver several movies in the 1960s and 1970s which are regarded today as classics.

Ashok Kumar also paved the way for his younger brothers Kalyan (Anoop) and Kishore Kumar. While Anoop is best remembered for his role in Chalti Ka Naam Gaadi (1958), Kishore went on to become a singer. Arguably, Kishore is today the most popular of the brothers.

He and his brother Anoop Kalyan (Anoop) acted in the 1990 Doordarshan Detective Serial Bheem Bhawani.

The distinctive style and mannerisms that Ashok Kumar adopted in his late career still remain extremely popular among mimicry artists.

Awards and recognition 
 1959 – Sangeet Natak Akademi Award
 1962 – Filmfare Award for Best Actor, Rakhi
 1962 – Padma Shri by the Government of India
 1963 – Nominated – Filmfare Award for Best Actor, Gumrah
 1963 – Bengal Film Journalists' Association – Best Actor Award (Hindi), Gumrah
 1966 – Filmfare Award for Best Supporting Actor, Afsana
 1967 – Nominated – Filmfare Award for Best Supporting Actor, Meherban
 1969 – Filmfare Award for Best Actor, Aashirwaad
 1969 – National Film Awards for Best Actor, Aashirwaad
 1969 – Bengal Film Journalists' Association Award for Best Actor (Hindi), Aashirwaad
 1969 – Nominated – Filmfare Award for Best Supporting Actor, Aashirwaad
 1973 – Nominated – Filmfare Award for Best Supporting Actor, Victoria No. 203
 1977 – Nominated – Filmfare Award for Best Supporting Actor, Chhoti Si Baat
 1988 – Dadasaheb Phalke Award, India's highest award for cinematic excellence
 1994 – Screen Lifetime Achievement Award
 1995 – Filmfare Lifetime Achievement Award
 1999 – Padma Bhushan by the Government of India
 2001 – Awadh Samman by the Government of Uttar Pradesh
 2007 – Screen Special Award

Filmography

References

Bibliography

External links 

1911 births
2001 deaths
20th-century Indian male actors
21st-century Indian male actors
Bengali male actors
Best Actor National Film Award winners
Dadasaheb Phalke Award recipients
Indian male film actors
Male actors from Mumbai
Male actors in Bengali cinema
Male actors in Hindi cinema
Male actors in Marathi cinema
People from Bhagalpur
People from Khandwa
Presidency University, Kolkata alumni
Recipients of the Sangeet Natak Akademi Award
Recipients of the Padma Bhushan in arts
Recipients of the Padma Shri in arts
University of Calcutta alumni
Filmfare Awards winners
Filmfare Lifetime Achievement Award winners